Hermannsburg is a municipality in Lower Saxony, Germany.

Hermannsburg may also refer to:

 Hermannsburg, KwaZulu-Natal, South Africa
 Hermannsburg, Northern Territory, Australia

See also
Hermannsburg Mission, originally an independent mission society in Hermannsburg, Germany
Hermannsburg Mission Seminary, a seminary in Hermannsburg, Germany
Hermannsburg mouse, also known as Hermannsburg (Mission) false-mouse and inland hopping mouse, a mouse endemic to Australia
Hermannsburg School, an Australian art movement
Hermannsburg School, South Africa, a school in Natal-KwaZulu, South Africa
Hermannsburg Mission House, a heritage site owned by the school